The 2023 Women's Finalissima will be the first edition of the Women's Finalissima, an intercontinental women's football match between the winners of the most recent European and South American championships. The match will feature England, winners of UEFA Women's Euro 2022, and Brazil, winners of the 2022 Copa América Femenina. It will be played at Wembley Stadium in London, England, on 6 April 2023. The match will be organised by UEFA and CONMEBOL as part of a renewed partnership between the two confederations.

Background
On 12 February 2020, UEFA and CONMEBOL signed a renewed memorandum of understanding meant to enhance cooperation between the two organisations. As part of the agreement, a joint UEFA–CONMEBOL committee examined the possibility of staging European–South American intercontinental matches, for both men's and women's football and across various age groups. In September 2021, UEFA and CONMEBOL announced the revival of the Artemio Franchi Cup between the winners of the men's UEFA European Championship and Copa América. On 15 December 2021, UEFA and CONMEBOL again signed a renewed memorandum of understanding lasting until 2028, which included specific provisions on opening a joint office in London and the potential organisation of various football events. On 2 June 2022, the day after staging the 2022 Finalissima, CONMEBOL and UEFA announced a series of new events between teams from the two confederations. This included the Women's Finalissima the winners of South America's Copa América Femenina and Europe's UEFA Women's Championship. As part of the announcement, the first edition was confirmed to take place in Europe, with the exact date and venue to be announced at a later date. The match was provisionally scheduled to be held during the FIFA International Match Calendar window of 13 to 25 February 2023, but was later confirmed to take place on 6 April 2023 in London. On 26 October 2022, it was confirmed the match would take place at Wembley Stadium.

Teams

England qualified for the match by virtue of winning UEFA Women's Euro 2022 as hosts, having defeated Germany 2–1 after extra time in the final. The win secured England's first major women's football title. Brazil qualified for the match by virtue of winning the 2022 Copa América Femenina, having defeated hosts Colombia 1–0 in the final. The win was Brazil's eighth Copa América title.

Match

Details

Notes

References

External links
 

2022–23 in UEFA football
2023 in South American football
England women's national football team matches
2022–23 in English women's football
Brazil women's national football team matches
2023 in Brazilian women's football
International association football competitions hosted by London
April 2023 sports events in the United Kingdom
2023 sports events in London
Association football matches in England
Scheduled association football competitions
Events at Wembley Stadium